Goliath, in comics, may refer to:

 Marvel Comics characters:
 Hank Pym, was the first to adopt the name Goliath and has also gone by Giant-Man, Ant-Man, and Yellowjacket.
 Clint Barton, is better known as the superhero Hawkeye; he used Henry Pym's size-changing gas to adopt the Goliath identity. 
 Bill Foster, Pym's lab assistant who used the Goliath identity before his death. He also went by the names Black Goliath and Giant Man.
 Erik Josten was originally known as the supervillain Power Man. He adopted the superheroic identity of Atlas upon joining the Thunderbolts.
 Tom Foster, Bill Foster's nephew, a student at MIT, worked to crack the Pym Particle code and become the new Goliath after his uncle's death. 
 Goliath (Amalgam Comics), a fictional Amalgam Comics superhero
 Goliath, a character who appeared in both the Marvel and Slave Labor Graphics series of Gargoyles.

See also
 Goliath (disambiguation)

References